William Floyd House, also known as Nicoll Floyd House and Old Mastic House, was a home of Founding Father William Floyd, a signer of the United States Declaration of Independence, in Mastic Beach, New York. It was his home from 1734 until 1803. This home is distinct from Gen. William Floyd House, his later home in Westernville, New York, that is also on the National Register and which was designated a National Historic Landmark.

The two William Floyd houses are believed to be the only surviving homes in New York of signers of the Declaration of Independence. The Mastic home is "reputed to be the best preserved and oldest manor house" in its part of Long Island.

The home was built by Nicoll Floyd, who was William Floyd's father, and was given to William's son, also named Nicoll Floyd. The house was visited by Marquis de Lafayette and others.

The house is owned by the National Park Service as part of Fire Island National Seashore, although it's not on Fire Island itself.

References

External links

National Park Service: William Floyd Estate

Houses on the National Register of Historic Places in New York (state)
Museums in Suffolk County, New York
Historic house museums in New York (state)
Houses in Suffolk County, New York
Houses completed in 1734
National Register of Historic Places in Suffolk County, New York
Homes of United States Founding Fathers